An Earth goddess is a deification of the Earth. Earth goddesses are often associated with the "chthonic" deities of the underworld.

Ki and Ninhursag are Mesopotamian earth goddesses. In Greek mythology, the Earth is personified as Gaia, corresponding to Roman Terra, Indic Prithvi/Bhūmi, etc. traced to an "Earth Mother" complementary to the "Sky Father" in Proto-Indo-European religion. Egyptian mythology exceptionally has a sky goddess and an Earth god.

Other Earth goddesses include:
 Chinese folk religion - Houtu (Di Mu)
 Meitei mythology and religion - Leimarel Sidabi, Panthoibi, Phouoibi
 Ancient Greek religion - Gaia, Cybele, Demeter, Persephone, Rhea
 Ancient Roman religion - Terra, Ceres, Ops, Proserpina
 Slavic - Mat Zemlya 
 Andean (Inca, Aymara) - Pachamama 
 Hinduism - Bhumi
 Native American - Spider Grandmother
 Romanian - Muma Padurii, Mama Gaia
 Mongolian and Turkic - Umay (Eje)
 Old Norse religion - Sif and Jörð
 Lithuanian mythology - Žemyna
 Māori - Papatūānuku
 Latvian mythology - Zemes māte and Māra
 Vietnamese folk religion - Mẫu Địa, Diêu Trì Địa Mẫu, Bà Thổ and Hậu Thổ
 Tai folk religion - Phra Mae Thorani and Phra Nang Bhum Chaiya  (พระนางภูมิไชยา - Bhummaso), "Tutelary goddess of Earth and Land" in Thailand, Cambodia , Laos and myanmar
 Mahayana and Vajrayana - Vasudhara
 Historical Vedic religion - Prithvi

See also
Mother Nature
Mother Earth (disambiguation)
Mother goddess
Earth in culture
Earth symbol
List of fertility deities

References

External links